Lynx is an unincorporated community in southwestern Brush Creek Township, Adams County, Ohio, United States.  It has a post office with the ZIP code 45650.  It is located along State Route 125.

History
A post office called Lynx has been in operation since 1879. The community was named after the lynx, which once was a common sight in the area.

Among its notable people is former Major League Baseball pitcher John Purdin.

Gallery

References

Unincorporated communities in Ohio
Unincorporated communities in Adams County, Ohio
1879 establishments in Ohio
Populated places established in 1879